Thrashbeast from Hell is a split EP by thrash metal bands Nocturnal and Toxic Holocaust released under Witchhammer Productions. The album was released on cassette tape limited to only 500 hand numbered copies.

Track listing

Personnel
Toxic Holocaust
 Joel Grind

References

2004 EPs
Toxic Holocaust albums